Nasser Al-Daajani (born 17 January 1997) is a Saudi Arabian professional footballer who plays as an midfielder for Al-Qadsiah.

Al-Daajani started his career in the youth setup of Al-Ahli. On 1 February 2017, he signed a three-year contract with the club, which also happened to be his first professional one. On 31 July 2018, Al-Daajani signed a four-year contract with Al-Ahli and was subsequently loaned out to Portuguese side Fátima until the end of the 2019–20 season. However, the loan was cut short and Al-Daajani returned to Saudi Arabia. On 25 January 2019, Al-Daajani joined Al-Taawoun until the end of the 2019–20 season. On 28 July 2021, Al-Daajani joined Al-Qadsiah.

Honours
Al-Taawoun
King Cup: 2019

References

External links
 

1997 births
Living people
Association football midfielders
Saudi Arabian footballers
Saudi Arabian expatriate footballers
Saudi Professional League players
Saudi First Division League players
Al-Ahli Saudi FC players
C.D. Fátima players
Al-Taawoun FC players
Al-Adalah FC players
Al-Qadsiah FC players
Expatriate footballers in Portugal
Saudi Arabian expatriate sportspeople in Portugal